Malavika Menon (born 6 March 1998) is an Indian actress who works in Malayalam and Tamil films mainly in supporting roles.

She made her career debut in 2012 with the film 916. She went on to play minor supporting roles before beginning to land starring roles later in 2012.

Filmography

References

External links
 
 

Living people
1998 births
Indian film actresses
Actresses in Tamil cinema
Actresses from Kerala
Actresses in Malayalam cinema
21st-century Indian actresses
Actresses from Thrissur